Blapsilon austrocaledonicum is a species of beetle in the family Cerambycidae. It was described by Xavier Montrouzier in 1861, originally under the genus Lamia. It is known from New Caledonia. It feeds on Araucaria laubenfelsii.

References

Tmesisternini
Beetles described in 1861